Aaron or Arron Davis may refer to:

Sportspeople
 Aaron Davis (boxer) (born 1967), American boxer
 Aaron Davis (basketball) (born 1979), American basketball player
Arron Davis (born 1972), English footballer

Musicians
 Bugzy Malone, English rapper, real name Aaron Davis

Characters
Aaron Davis, character in Latter Days
Prowler (Aaron Davis), a Marvel Comics character

See also
Aaron Davies (disambiguation)
Aaron Davey (born 1983), Australian footballer